Korczyna  is a village in Krosno County, Subcarpathian Voivodeship, in south-eastern Poland. It is the seat of the gmina (administrative district) called Gmina Korczyna.

The village has a population of 6,000.

Jewish History in Korczyna
Korczyna had a vibrant Jewish community before the Holocaust. Though the Jewish Study Centre and synagogue are no longer present, the Korczyna Jewish Cemetery is still present in the outskirts of Korczyna.

People 
 Wojciech Smarzowski, Polish film director

References

Villages in Krosno County
Kingdom of Galicia and Lodomeria
Lwów Voivodeship